The  is a Japanese cooperative bank serving over 5,612 agricultural, fishing and forestry cooperatives from its headquarters in Tokyo. The bank is one of Japan's largest institutional investors with an investment portfolio of more than US$400 billion and assets exceeding US$840 billion. Through overseas branches located in New York City, London, and Singapore, the bank invests in bond, securitization products, stock, private equity, and real estate. Since huge assets as much as US$840 billion are managed by only around 3,200 employees, the bank is mainly engaged in asset management and large scale corporate financing. Its members include cooperative federations such as the Japan Agricultural Cooperatives (JA) and the Japan Fishery Cooperatives (JF). Norinchukin supports political lobbies who oppose agricultural imports and the deterioration of living standards in rural areas. Norinchukin has 41 offices throughout Japan and five overseas branches.

History

The Norinchukin Bank was founded on December 20, 1923 by the Japanese government to support the country's agriculture industry. Norinchukin is derived from the bank's Japanese name Nō - Rin - Chūō - Kinko (Agriculture - forestry - central - credit union). Norinchukin suffered from a lack of investment funds during World War II, due to restrictions by the Japanese government.  After the war, Norinchukin played an important role in rebuilding the country. Once the government encouraged divestment in the textile industry, Norinchukin formed a political lobby to support the agriculture sector. In 1979, Norinchukin set up an international department and formed a relationship with the Bank of Japan. Low interest rates in the 1980s impacted Norinchukin's profitability. The Japanese government adjusted the charter of Norinchukin in 1986 and allowed the bank to operate as a commercial bank. Following the global recession in 2008, Norinchukin indicated it had ¥9.7 billion in losses related to the subprime mortgage crisis.[1][2] For the 2009 fiscal year, Norinchukin posted a net income of ¥29.5 billion.

References

External links

 Official Website

Banks of Japan
Cooperative banking in Asia
Banks established in 1923
Japanese companies established in 1923
Financial services companies based in Tokyo
Japanese brands
Cooperatives in Japan